Don Juan Tenorio is a 1898 Mexican silent drama film directed by Salvador Toscano who was Mexico's first filmmaker  and is also the first film adaptation of Don Juan Tenorio a play by José Zorrilla.

References

External links 
 

Mexican silent films
1898 films
Mexican black-and-white films
Films based on the Don Juan legend
1898 in Mexico
Mexican drama films
1890s drama films
Silent drama films